Brian Doyle (born 1991 in Barntown, County Wexford) is an Irish sportsperson.  He plays hurling with his local club Shelmaliers and has been a member of the Wexford senior inter-county team since 2011.

Playing career

Club

Doyle plays his club hurling with the Shelmaliers club.

Inter-county

Doyle has lined out in all grades for Wexford, beginning as a member of the county's minor team in 2009.  His tenure as a member of the minor team saw Wexford lose the Leinster final to Kilkenny.  Doyle subsequently joined the Wexford under-21 hurling team.

Doyle made his senior championship debut when he came on as a substitute against Antrim in 2011.

References

1991 births
Living people
Wexford inter-county hurlers
Shelmaliers hurlers